Jack Leswick  (January 1, 1910 – August 4, 1934) was a Canadian ice hockey centre who played 37 games in the National Hockey League with the Chicago Black Hawks during the 1933–34 season. The rest of his career, which lasted from 1929 to 1934, was mainly spent in the American Hockey Association. Leswick died in the summer of 1934, shortly after Chicago won the Stanley Cup.

Playing career
Jack Leswick played 3½ seasons for the Duluth Hornets of the AHA. He spent the second half of 1932–33 playing for the Wichita Blue Jays. He began the 1934 season in the AHA playing for the Kansas City Greyhounds. Leswick was called up to the Chicago Black Hawks shortly after the beginning of the 1934 season. He played 37 games, scoring 1 goal and 7 assists and was assessed 16 penalty minutes (PIM), as Chicago won the Stanley Cup championship that spring, though Leswick did not play any playoff games

Suspicious death
Leswick died in the off-season after the 1933–34 season. His body was found in the Assiniboine River without his wallet or other valuables. Leswick's death was ruled either a suicide or accident by the Winnipeg Coroner.

Personal life
Two of Leswick's brothers, Pete and Tony, played in the NHL. Pete played briefly with the New York Rangers and Boston Bruins and Tony spent 12 seasons in the NHL with the New York Rangers, Chicago Black Hawks, and Detroit Red Wings. Tony won the Stanley Cup three times with Detroit in 1952, 1954, and 1955. Leswick's nephew is former Major League Baseball player Lenny Dykstra.

Career statistics

Regular season and playoffs

Awards and achievements
1934 Stanley Cup Championship  (Chicago Black Hawks)

See also
 List of ice hockey players who died during their playing career

References

External links
 

1910 births
1934 deaths
Canadian ice hockey centres
Chicago Blackhawks players
Duluth Hornets players
Ice hockey people from Saskatchewan
Kansas City Greyhounds players
Sportspeople from Humboldt, Saskatchewan
Stanley Cup champions
Wichita Blue Jays players
Deaths by drowning in Canada